Robert John Woods (January 7, 1859 – June 19, 1944) was a Canadian farmer and political figure. He represented Dufferin in the House of Commons of Canada as a Progressive member from 1921 to 1925.

Woods was born in Gorrie, Huron County, Canada West and later moved to Carrick Township in Bruce County with his family. He purchased a farm in Melancthon Township in Dufferin County, where he served on the township council and later became reeve. Woods ran unsuccessfully for a seat in the provincial assembly in 1907 and 1908 as a Temperance Conservative. He was defeated in his bid for reelection in 1925. In 1937, he moved near Guelph.

External links 

History of Dufferin County, S Sawden (1952)

1859 births
1944 deaths
Progressive Party of Canada MPs
Members of the House of Commons of Canada from Ontario